Fashion 99 is a Canadian short film, directed by Karen Firus and released in 1987. Set in a futuristic world where the fashion industry controls society, the film stars Sharron Kearney as Orchid, a fashion photographer who has a nightmare that her clothes attack her in a bid for revenge.

The film, made while Firus was a film student at the University of British Columbia, premiered at the Festival of Canadian Fashion in June 1987. It won the festival's special jury award for excellence in fashion video. It subsequently screened at the 1987 Montreal World Film Festival, where it won the Norman McLaren Award for Best Student Film.

The film received a Genie Award nomination for Best Theatrical Short Film at the 9th Genie Awards in 1988.

References

External links
 

1987 films
1987 short films
Canadian science fiction short films
1980s English-language films
1980s Canadian films